Yaakov ‘Kobi’ Shabtai (Hebrew: יעקב (קובי) שבתאי) (born November 11, 1964) is an Israeli police officer, and the 19th Commissioner of Israel Police since January 17, 2021. Prior to that, he served as Commander of the Border Police.

Biography 
Kobi Shabtai was born on November 11, 1964, in Ashkelon, Israel, to Iraqi Jewish immigrants. He is married with three daughters, including one who serves as a patrol officer in the police and another who enlisted in the Israel Border Police for her national service.

Career 
Shabtai was enlisted in the 202nd Battalion of the Paratroopers Brigade in 1982. He was discharged in 1987 at the end of his service at the rank of Sgan aluf.

Shabtai joined the Israel Border Police in 1991.

In July 2020, Shabtai was diagnosed with COVID-19.

Commissioner of Israel Police 
Shabtai was appointed the Commissioner of Israel Police on January 17, 2021, succeeding Motti Cohen.

On 25 April 2021, Shabtai ordered the removal of barricades preventing access to the Damascus Gate in East Jerusalem after violent protests.

Following the 2021 Mount Meron crowd crush, Shabtai said that he would not allow the police to be scapegoated for the incident.

References 

1964 births
Living people
Israeli police chiefs
Israeli Jews
Israeli people of Iraqi-Jewish descent
People from Ashkelon